Jaime Vila Capdevila (1860 – 21 July 1954) was a physical education teacher, sports promoter and leader. He is widely regarded as one of the most important figures in the amateur beginnings of gymnastics and football in Catalonia, having been one of the fundamental heads behind the Tolosa Gymnasium, which he served as a teacher and later as director, as well as being the main driving force behind the foundation of Català FC, serving as the first president of the club between 1899 and 1905.

As the founder of Català, Vila was the great rival of FC Barcelona, founded by Joan Gamper, at the turn of the century. Jaime Vila's Català and Gamper's FC Barcelona would star in a long controversy about the "Deanery" of football in the city. In addition to gymnastics and football, he also promoted athletics, wrestling, fencing and boxing. He was also a member of the Center Excursionista de Catalunya for more than forty years. He received numerous distinctions, such as the honorary diploma of the Spanish Gymnastics Federation in 1900. In 1947 he received a tribute in which he was recognized as dean of gymnastics in Barcelona.

Gymnastics career
Born in 1860 in the Lleida town of Les Oluges to a family of peasants, Vila moved to Barcelona at the tender age of just 14 years old. He had several jobs during his first years in the Catalan capital, from working in a coal factory to even acting as a cook, before finally joining the Tolosa Gymnasium (run by Eduardo Tolosa) as a teacher in the mid 1880s. The gymnasiums were few at the time, with the oldest one in the city being as old as him, having been founded in 1860 by pioneer Joaquim Ramis i Taix. Vila was a man of clear and personal ideas and in the early 1890s, he set out to create a system that would make work all the muscles of the body, without exception. Although he already had some knowledge about anatomy, he asked for the advice of a doctor to make sure it was safe. His system consisted of a series of exercises, and he named it after "Physical culture". First, he had a blacksmith build a series of pulleys in the gym, which at that time constituted a novelty, and then, he combined those devices with weights, rope, ladder, and bars. Every day a different exercise had to be fulfilled, which lasted 45 minutes, and then repeat each movement 25 times. In the end, they took stimulating cold water from hoses; later, however, he settled for the shower. This system, which had nothing to do with what he had practiced in Tolosa, introduce the novelty of a self-made educational system, which distinguished the Tolosa gym from the rest, and thus, it began attracting a lot of new students, who were mainly athletes who faced tough physical challenges, such as boxers, cyclists or rowers, who came to his gym to better strengthen their body. He became the Tolosa gym's director in the late 1890s, a position he held until the early 1900s.

He was a serious man of few words and with a very strict lifestyle. He dedicated his life and efforts to his vocation, which was "not the triumph, but simple and constant physical improvement". This is why he lived a long life for his time, dying an unmarried man at the age of 94, and having worked until just months before his death. He stayed in the gymnasium morning and afternoons, attending to his students (and he always had students), and sometimes he even had private classes at noon. And Sundays were used to organize all kinds of competitions and excursions outside the city. In 1898 he organized a pilgrimage in Catalonia, which went from Barcelona to Sarria. He was also a member of the Center Excursionista de Catalunya for more than forty years. On 24 September 1900, in a meeting held in Barcelona by the Spanish Gymnastics Federation, he was ​​awarded the first Diploma of Honor, created by the painter Antonio Utrillo. In 1913, in the First Spanish International Congress on Tuberculosis, he was awarded the Medal of Gold and the Diploma of Honor in gymnastics.

Footballing career
Football began taking root in the city in the 1890s, and soon it gained followers among members belonging to the Tolosa Gymnasium, where Vila was introduced to football by his younger students. As a lover of sport and physical culture, he also began practicing this new sport at the Velódromo de la Bonanova, and eventually, he began to promote it among his students. It was around this time that Vila met Joan Gamper, who came to him to propose the idea of creating a well-organized football club, but Vila dismissed him because he was foreign. On 21 October 1899, Vila, together with his students, founded the Català Futbol Club, in a meeting held at the Tolosa gym, thus becoming the first football team formed in Catalonia. Although the club was founded in October, Català was not officially established until 17 December 1899, in a meeting held in the Café San Gervasio de Cassolas, in which they formalized the first board of directors with Jaime Vila being named the club's first president, while Miguel Valdés, one of his best students, became the club's treasurer.

On the following day, 22 October, they organized their first training with a match between the club's members, most of which were Vila's students, and as their teacher, he inevitably was the referee of that game, and despite not actually knowing how the rules of the sport worked, he displayed great skills as a referee. All the men involved in that game were Catalans, because in its beginnings, Vila wanted to promote local sport, and thus, it only admitted Catalan players to its team, hence the club's name, and hence the exclusion of Gamper for being a foreign, and this is why Gamper went on to found FC Barcelona on 29 November 1899, in the Solé Gymnasium (Tolosa's rival). Naturally, Vila's Català FC and Gamper's FC Barcelona had a very strong rivalry during the first years of football in Catalonia, starring in a long controversy about the "Deanery" of football in the city, with the polemics about who was the first official club of Barcelona (the club dean of the city) finishing only when the blaugranas proved that they had been the first club to be registered in the civil registry on 29 November, only a few days before Català FC, who did it on 17 December. Either way, Vila stayed out of it, as above all, he wanted football to be practiced in an absolutely sporting way, unrelated to official status. In fact, the only reason why he began to promote football among his students was because it was the sport with the best chance of hatching among that generation of Barcelona gymnasts due to being an outdoor sport, and that is also why most of the first Barcelona clubs were born in gyms and under the protection and encouragement of characters linked to the Spanish Gymnastic Federation such as Jaime Vila and Narciso Masferrer. Despite becoming known for not admitting foreigners, Català accepted its first foreign players just two months after its foundation, when on 11 February 1900, Català decided to name six Scots as honorary partners: Hamilton, Denniston, Dykes, Gold, Girvan and A. Black.

On 10 January 1903, the name of the club changed to Català Sport Club, when the club merged with the recent-dissolved Club Universitari, but Vila stayed at the heel and kept carrying out the effective presidency, and later, the honorary one. His legacy as a pioneer of Catalan football has been largely forgotten due to his discretion and simplicity.

Later life
In 1904 he founded Gimnàs Vila, where he continued his work as a great popularizer and promoter of gymnastics, athletics, Greco-Roman wrestling, fencing, and boxing. In 1917 he moved his Gymnasium to a basement on the number 87 of street de Pau CIaiis, where it is still open. He lived his later life alone, except for a niece who began to help him every afternoon at the gym. They came to Barcelona shortly before the Spanish Civil War began, so they had to live in a flat on Bonavista street, but they got through it without any major incident.

In April 1947 he received a tribute in which he was recognized as the dean of gymnastics in Barcelona. He suffered a stroke a few years later, from which he recovered almost entirely by force through gymnastics. Vila died on 21 July 1954 at the age of 94.

References

1860 births
1954 deaths
Spanish footballers
Spanish referees and umpires
Spanish gymnasts